Acracona elgonae is a species of snout moth in the genus Acracona. It was described by Whalley, in 1964, and is known from Uganda.

References

Endemic fauna of Uganda
Tirathabini
Moths described in 1964
Snout moths of Africa
Moths of Africa